WNAM (1280 kHz) is a commercial AM radio station licensed to Neenah-Menasha, Wisconsin, that serves the Appleton-Oshkosh radio market.  The station is owned by Cumulus Media.  It uses the "America's Best Music" radio format supplied by co-owned Westwood One, that combines soft oldies with a few adult standards and middle of the road songs each hour.

The station also carries Wisconsin Timber Rattlers Midwest League baseball.  Most hours begin with Westwood One News.

History
The station signed on the air on May 23, 1947, with 1,000 watts of power.  WNAM was owned by Neenah-Menasha Broadcasting Company, with studios on Wisconsin Avenue in Neenah.  The station was originally a daytimer, required to go off the air at night, when radio waves travel farther.  In the 1960s, the station got authorization from the Federal Communications Commission (FCC) to broadcast at night at 1,000 watts, with its daytime power raised to 5,000 watts.

Ron Ross began working at WNAM in 1973 as afternoon host and eventually became program director when WNAM was a Top 40 radio station. In 1976, Ross was named by Billboard one of the country's top five Top 40 personalities for markets with fewer than 1 million people. During his time at WNAM, the station achieved a 17.6 Arbitron rating.

Jim Roberts was hired by WNAM in the fall of 1987 to host the afternoon show. He stayed until late 1998.

In the 1990s Value Radio Corp., owner of WOSH, purchased WNAM and WUSW in Oshkosh, Wisconsin from Odon Communications Group.

Cumulus Broadcasting already owned WNAM, WOSH, WVBO and WWWX when the company bought WPKR and WPCK from Midwest Dimensions Inc. in an $8.1 million deal announced July 2, 2003.

"Mad Dog and Merrill" joined WNAM in 2008 for a cooking-related show airing weekdays from 10 to noon.

In 2008, WNAM began carrying Wisconsin Timber Rattlers Midwest League baseball games.  The station's contract has been extended through 2021.

References

External links

FCC History Cards for WNAM

Adult standards radio stations in the United States
NAM
Radio stations established in 1947
1947 establishments in Wisconsin
Cumulus Media radio stations